Shayesteh Ghaderpour (born 10 April 1984), also known as Shayesteh Ghader Pour, is an Iranian chess player who holds the title of Woman International Master. She is a silver medalist the Iranian Women's Chess Championship and has represented Iran at six Chess Olympiads.

Biography
In 2009, Shayesteh Ghader Pour won Iranian Women's Rapid Chess Championship. In 2011, she won West Asian Zonal Women's Chess Championship and was given the right to participate in Women's World Chess Championship. In 2012, she was second in Iranian Women's Chess Championship (tournament won Mitra Hejazipour). In 2012, in Khanty-Mansiysk Shayesteh Ghader Pour made her debut at the Women's World Chess Championship, where in the first round she lost to Pia Cramling.

Shayesteh Ghader Pour has played for Iran:
 at six Women's Chess Olympiads (1996, 2002, 2006–2012);
 at five Women's Asian Team Chess Championships (2005—2014), where she won two team bronze (2009, 2014) medals, and individual silver (2005) and bronze (2008) medals;
 at Asian Games team chess tournament in 2010;
 at two Asian Indoor Games team chess tournaments (2007—2009).

References

External links
 
 
 

1984 births
Sportspeople from Tehran
Iranian female chess players
Chess Woman International Masters
Chess Olympiad competitors
Living people
Chess players at the 2010 Asian Games
Asian Games competitors for Iran